Gilbert Saulnier du Verdier (? –1686) was a French author who wrote Le Romant des Romans, which was translated into English in 1640 under the title The Love and Armes of the Greeke Princes, Or, The Romant of the Romants.

1686 deaths
17th-century French writers
17th-century French male writers